The Kelkit River ( or Kelkit Çayı), is a river in the Black Sea Region of Turkey.  It is the longest tributary of the Yeşilırmak. Its name derives from the Armenian Gayl get ( 'wolf river', Kayl ked in Western Armenian pronunciation). Its Greek name is Lykos, also meaning 'wolf', and romanized as Lycus.

It rises in Gümüşhane Province and runs through the provinces of Erzincan, Giresun, Sivas, and Tokat before flowing into the Yeşilırmak at the modern village of Kızılçubuk, near the site of the ancient city of Eupatoria. The Kelkit follows the North Anatolian Fault for about 150 km from Suşehri to Resadiye and Niksar.

In Hellenistic times, a major east-west road following the valley of the Kelkit led from Armenia Minor to Bithynia.

It was the site of the Battle of the Lycus in 66 BCE

Phanaroea

The valley of the last 40 km of the Kelkit is the Erbaa plain (Erbaa Ovası), known in antiquity as the Phanaroea.

Notes

Bibliography
 Kelkit Basin Museums

Rivers of Turkey
Rivers of Gümüşhane Province
Eastern Anatolia Region
Rivers of Giresun Province